McIlhenny's four-eyed opossum (Philander mcilhennyi) is a South American species of Opossum. Found in Brazil and Peru, it is almost entirely black, except for white spots above each eye.

This species is named for John Stauffer "Jack" McIlhenny (1909-1997), a grandson of the founder of the McIlhenny Company, maker of Tabasco sauce.  He funded the 1968 Louisiana State University expedition that discovered the species.

References

External links
John F. Eisenberg and Kent H. Redford, 2000. Mammals of Neotropics: Ecuador, Bolivia and Brazil.
Maggie Heyn Richardson, "Rara avis", Imagine Louisiana magazine, Spring 2007, pp. 46–48.

Opossums
Marsupials of South America
Mammals of Brazil
Mammals of Peru
Mammals described in 1972